Raghuveer may refer to:

Raghuveer (actor) (1963–2014), Indian film actor and director in Kannada films
Raghuveer Chaudhari, Indian novelist
Raghuvir Meena, Indian Member of Parliament from Udaipur constituency in Rajasthan
Raghuveer Singh Koshal, Indian Member of Parliament from Kota constituency of Rajasthan
Raghubir Yadav (AKA Raghuvir Yadav, born 1957), Indian film, stage and television actor, music composer, singer and set designer

See also
Raghuvir (disambiguation)